Heiko Bleher (born 18 October 1944) is a German researcher, author, photographer, and filmmaker. He is best known in the scientific community for his contribution to the exploration of fresh and brackish water habitats worldwide. He has discovered numerous species of fish and aquatic plant, several of which carry his name or are named in honor of Bleher's family.

Biography 
Heiko Bleher was born in Frankfurt on Main, Germany. He is the fourth and last child of Ludwig Bleher and Amanda Flora Hilda Bleher née Kiel. Bleher inherited his passion for freshwater fishes and aquatic plants from his mother. Amanda Flora Hilda Bleher was the daughter of Adolf Kiel, who is known as the "Father of Water Plants" and a pioneer of the modern aquarium. Adolf Kiel established the world's largest plant and ornamental fish farm in Frankfurt am Main, Germany, in 1900.

At the age of 4, Bleher's mother took him to Equatorial Guinea, in West Africa, on a research expedition. Two years later, he accompanied his mother on a journey throughout Europe, collecting plants and fishes. From age seven, he and his three siblings joined their mother on her adventurous exploration trip deep into the "green hell" of the South American jungle. During this two-year expedition, his mother discovered many new aquatic plant species, fishes and other animals. At the end of 1958, Bleher's family settled permanently in Brazil and established a water-plant nursery and fish-breeding hatchery called "Osiris" in the jungle outside Rio de Janeiro. In 1962, Bleher moved to the United States and later attended the University of South Florida, studying courses in ichthyology, biology, limnology, oceanography, parasitology, combined with work at Elsberry's Fish Farm and at Gulf Fish Farm. Upon returning to Rio de Janeiro in 1964, Bleher established his own export company, "Aquarium Rio", and continued his research and collecting throughout Brazil.

In 1964, Bleher introduced the Hemigrammus bleheri (the brilliant rummy-head tetra) to the aquarium hobby. It was the first species to be named after him. Bleher contributed to the rainbowfish species community by introducing Melanotaenia boesemani and many of the other almost 100 species of rainbowfish. In 1970, Bleher was the first to collect live Pterophyllum altum from Venezuela.

Taxa named after him and his family
The tetra Hemigrammus bleheri 
Leporinus bleheri 
Bleheratherina pierucciae 
The Cichlid Steatocranus bleheri M. K. Meyer 
The Snakehead Channa bleheri 
The African Tetra Phenacogrammus bleheri 
Moenkhausia heikoi 
The Rainbowfish Chilatherina bleheri 
The Bromeliad Vriesea bleheri, collected by Amanda and Michael Bleher 
Hyphessobrycon amandae is named in honor of Amanda Bleher (1910–1991), the mother of Heiko Bleher, who collected the type specimen and because of her interest in and her knowledge of the freshwater fauna and flora of Brazil

Controversies 
In 2012, Bleher was accused of plagiarising fish images, submitting them as his own for a Practical Fishkeeping article entitled "PFK's Definitive Guide to Channa". In 2019, he was again accused of plagiarism, whereby images of freshwater fishes were used uncredited in his book "Indian Ornamental Fishes Volume 1". The images were, in fact, the property of a well-known blog writer based in India.

References

1944 births
Living people
Scientists from Frankfurt
German ichthyologists
German emigrants to Brazil
20th-century Brazilian botanists
20th-century Brazilian zoologists